Ray Buktenica  (born August 6, 1943) is an American film and television character actor.  He has played numerous roles, primarily on television since 1972.  He is best known for playing the character Benny Goodwin, the boyfriend and later fiancé of Brenda Morgenstern on the 1970s sitcom Rhoda, Dr. Solomon on House Calls and Jerry Berkson, Libby's boss on Life Goes On. He provided the voice of Hugo Strange in the character's sole appearance on Batman: The Animated Series. In 1996, he guest-starred on Lois & Clark: The New Adventures of Superman as Leo Nunk, a newspaper reporter.  In 1997, he guest-starred on Star Trek: Deep Space Nine, in the episode "By Inferno's Light", as Deyos, the Vorta in command of the Dominion's Internment Camp 371.

Filmography

References

External links

1943 births
Male actors from New York City
Living people
American male television actors
20th-century American male actors
21st-century American male actors